Psara (known in ancient times as /, /) is a Greek island in the Aegean Sea. Together with the small island of Antipsara (Population 4) it forms the municipality of Psara. It is part of the Chios regional unit, which is part of the North Aegean region. The only town of the island and seat of the municipality is also called Psara.

Psara had 448 inhabitants according to the 2011 census. It has a small port linking to the island of Chios and other parts of Greece.

It was also the site of the Psara massacre, in which thousands of Greeks on the island were massacred by Ottoman troops during the Greek War of Independence in 1824.

Geography

The highest point on the island is "Profitis Ilias".

Flag
The modern flag of Psara is based largely on the island's famous revolutionary flag created by Psariot locals in 1824. The original flag, carried during the War of Independence by Psariot ships, was made of white cloth bordered with red. A snake was wrapped around the anchor, often depicted with a bird flying near its mouth. An original 1824 flag of Psara is preserved at the National Historical Museum of Greece.

The flag of Psara currently in use has a very similar design but omits the island's name and bears a star below the crescent.

History
Psara has been inhabited since the Mycenaean period, its inhabitants relying on the sea to make a living as the island is treeless and rocky with little shrubbery.

Homer, Strabo, Cratinus, Suda and Stephanus of Byzantium referred to the island as Psyra and Psyrian.
The island had a city also called Psyra.

The islanders' sole source of livelihood has always been fishing, mainly for the locally abundant slipper lobsters, and shipping, with some tourist development in recent years.

The Greek ancient proverb Psyra celebrating Dionysos originated from the fact that Psyra was a poor and small island which could not produce its own wine, and was used in reference to people who were reclining at a symposium but not drinking. Another ancient Greek proverb, You regard Sparta as Psyra, also expressed the poverty of the island.

During the middle ages Psara had a very small population, which abandoned the island for Chios after the Fall of Constantinople. In the 16th century, under the Ottoman rule, the Psariots returned to their homeland along with other settlers and established a settlement around the Palaiokastro fort which they repaired. They turned to trade, amassing great profits. By the beginning of the 19th century the Psariots had the third largest trade fleet in Greece after Hydra and Spetses, numbering some 45 ships.

Destruction

Psara joined the Greek War of Independence on April 10, 1821. Future Prime Minister Konstantinos Kanaris, Dimitrios Papanikolis, Andreas Pipinos and Nikolis Apostolis distinguished themselves as naval leaders, using fire ships to combat the more powerful Ottoman Navy. Psara's native population of  people was further augmented by  refugees from Thessaly, Macedonia, Chios, Moschonisia and Kydonies.

On July 3 (June 21 O.S.), 1824, the island was invaded by the Turks. The resistance of the Psariots ended the next day with a last stand at the town's old fort of Palaiokastro (alternative name Mavri Rachi, literally "black ridge"). Hundreds of soldiers and also women and children had taken refuge there when an Ottoman force of  stormed the fort. The refugees first threw a white flag with the words "Ἐλευθερία ἤ Θάνατος" ("Eleftheria i Thanatos", "Freedom or Death"). Then, the moment the Turks entered the fort, the local Antonios Vratsanos lit a fuse to the gunpowder stock, in an explosion that killed the town's inhabitants along with their enemies — thus remaining faithful to their flag to their death. A French officer who heard and saw the explosion compared it to a volcanic eruption of Vesuvius.

A part of the population managed to flee the island, but those who did not were either sold into slavery or killed. As a result of the invasion, thousands of Greeks met a tragic fate. The island was deserted and surviving islanders were scattered through what is now Southern Greece. Theophilos Kairis, a priest and scholar, took on many of the orphaned children and developed the famous school the Orphanotropheio of Theophilos Kairis. Psara remained in the hands of the Ottomans until it was recaptured by the Greek navy on 21 October 1912 during the First Balkan War.

Historical population

A native of Psara is known in English as a Psariot or a Psarian.

Notable people

Notable natives and inhabitants of the island include:
 Ioannis Varvakis (1745–1825), admiral, caviar merchant and benefactor.
 Nikolis Apostolis (1770–1827), admiral.
 Dimitrios Papanikolis (1790–1855), admiral.
 Konstantinos Kanaris (1793/1795–1877), admiral and politician, Prime Minister of Greece.
 Garafilia Mohalbi (1817–1830), Greek-American refugee and former slave.
 George Sirian (1818–1891), United States Navy officer.

See also
 List of settlements in the Chios regional unit
 Greek ship Psara
 Destruction of Psara

References

External links
 https://web.archive.org/web/20070611074035/http://www.chios.com/island/psara.htm (also in German and Greek)
 http://www.sansimera.gr/archive/articles/show.php?id=156&feature=H_katastrofi_ton_Psaron (The destruction of Psara, in Greek)
 http://www.ptolemais.com/shmaies/epanastatimena.htm (The flags of the rebellious islands (Psara), in Greek)

 
Populated places in Chios (regional unit)
Municipalities of the North Aegean
Landforms of Chios (regional unit)
Islands of the North Aegean